Doki! Doki! Yūenchi: Crazy Land Daisakusen (ドキ!ドキ! クレイジーランド, lit. Thump Thump Amusement Park: Crazy Land Tactics) is a Nintendo Family Computer video game developed by KID and released in 1991 by VAP. Frankie is crazy land was originally called  in Japanese, meaning "Thump! Thump! Amusement Park".  is a Japanese onomatopoeia.

Gameplay 

Players control a boy with a helmet who kicks balls at enemies in an attempt to save his girlfriend from an unknown force inside an amusement park. The more damage he takes the more damage he does to enemies.

Release 

The game was scheduled for a North American release under the title Crazyland! The Ride Of Your Life!, however the publisher NTVIC cancelled it. Before the game's US release was cancelled, it was featured in the "Pak Watch" section of Nintendo Power Magazine, issue 29 (October 1991). The game was renamed The Trolls in Crazyland for release on the NES by American Softworks. It was to be released as Crazyland, but a change was made to feature the popular Troll dolls. That version was only released in Italy (PAL-A) and Western Europe (PAL-B).

Reception 

Doki! Doki! Yūenchi: Crazy Land Daisakusen was met with mixed reception from critics since its release. Public reception was also mixed; in a poll taken by Family Computer Magazine, Japanese readers voted to give the game a 19.2 out of 30 score, indicating a mixed following.

Notes

References

External links 

 The Trolls in Crazyland at GameFAQs
 The Trolls in Crazyland at MobyGames

1991 video games
KID games
Nintendo Entertainment System games
Nintendo Entertainment System-only games
VAP (company) games
Video games developed in Japan
Video games set in amusement parks
ASC Games games
Single-player video games